Cheshmeh Kabud (also Romanized as Cheshmeh Kabūd) is a village in Keshvari Rural District, in the Central District of Ilam County, Ilam Province, Iran. At the 2006 census, its population was 941, in 213 families. The village is populated by Kurds.

References 

Populated places in Ilam County
Kurdish settlements in Ilam Province